"Our Last Song Together" is a 1973 song recorded by Neil Sedaka. It is a track from his LP The Tra-La Days Are Over, and was the third of four single releases from the album.

The song became a Top 40 hit in the UK (#31) and Ireland (#19) for Sedaka in late 1973. It also became a minor U.S. hit for both Bobby Sherman and Bo Donaldson & the Heywoods.

Background
Co-written by Sedaka with his long-term songwriting partner Howard Greenfield, they wrote "Our Last Song Together" after Sedaka convinced Greenfield that bringing their nearly 20-year relationship to an end in order to work with others would be mutually beneficial. Sedaka's collaborations with Greenfield were no longer charting, and after experimenting with several other songwriters (among them Roger Atkins and Carole Bayer), Sedaka had begun to find success with lyricist Phil Cody, who would write many of the lyrics for Sedaka's comeback. Greenfield had been collaborating with other songwriters as well (such as Jack Keller and Helen Miller) but had almost no success after breaking off from Sedaka. Greenfield was largely distraught by the breakup; he nevertheless decided to write "Our Last Song Together" and "Love Will Keep Us Together" as their last songs. Ironically, "Love Will Keep Us Together" would become their biggest hit when recorded by the Captain & Tennille in 1975; the success (along with Phil Cody's encouragement) prompted Sedaka and Greenfield to resume writing songs together in the late 1970s, culminating in their last hit, "Should've Never Let You Go."

Synopsis
The song is a nostalgic self-description of the breakup of the songwriting partnership between Sedaka and Greenfield.  Greenfield's lyrics include numerous homages to the songs he and Sedaka had written in the 1950s and early 1960s.

Personnel
Neil Sedaka – lead vocals, piano
Lol Creme – guitars, backing vocals
Eric Stewart – guitars, backing vocals
Graham Gouldman – bass guitars, backing vocals
Kevin Godley – drums, percussion, backing vocals
Del Newman – orchestral arrangements

Cover versions
The first cover of "Our Last Song Together" was recorded by Euson in 1973.  In 1975, two covers of "Our Last Song Together" charted in the U.S.:  Bobby Sherman on the Easy Listening chart and Bo Donaldson and The Heywoods on the Pop chart. 

Agnetha Fältskog (ABBA) recorded a Swedish cover version in 1973, "Vi har hunnit fram till refrängen" as the B-Side to her solo single, "En sång om sorg och glädje" which reached #1 on the Swedish charts in 1973. Both songs were included on her 1973 album, Agnetha Fältskogs bästa .

The song was also covered in 1975 by Pratt & McClain.

Chart history
Neil Sedaka

Bo Donaldson & the Heywoods

Bobby Sherman

References

External links
Lyrics of this song
 
 

 

1973 songs
1973 singles
1975 singles
Neil Sedaka songs
Songs written by Neil Sedaka
Songs with lyrics by Howard Greenfield
Bo Donaldson and The Heywoods songs
Bobby Sherman songs
The Rocket Record Company singles
Number-one singles in Sweden
Songs about music